A Hill may refer to:

*Aaron Hill (disambiguation), multiple people
Adin Hill (born 1996), Canadian ice hockey goaltender
Agnes Leonard Hill (1842–1917), American journalist, author, poet, newspaper founder/publisher, evangelist, social reformer
Al Hill (disambiguation), multiple people
Alan Hill (disambiguation), multiple people
Alban Hill (died 1559), Welsh physician
Albert Hill (disambiguation), multiple people
Alec Hill (1916–2008), Australian military historian and academic
Alex Hill (disambiguation), multiple people
Alexander Hill (disambiguation), multiple people
Alex Hyndman Alexandra Hill (born 1978), British journalist and newscaster
Alexandra Hill Tinoco, Salvadorian politician
Alexis Hill (disambiguation), multiple people
Alfred Hill (disambiguation), multiple people
Alisa Hill (born 1965), American middle-distance runner
Allen Hill (disambiguation)
Ally Hill (born 1934), Scottish footballer
A. P. Hill (Ambrose Powell Hill) (1825–1865), Confederate general in the American Civil War
Andre Hill (died 2020), African-American man killed by police
Andrew Hill (disambiguation), multiple people
Andy Hill (disambiguation), multiple people
Anita Hill (born 1956), American lawyer, alleged victim of sexual harassment by Clarence Thomas
Anthony Hill (disambiguation), multiple people
Antony Hill (disambiguation), multiple people
Archibald Hill (A. V. Hill) (1886–1977), British Nobel laureate for Physiology or Medicine (1922)
Arthur Hill (disambiguation), multiple people
A. T. Hill (Asa Thomas Hill) (1871–1953), American businessman and archaeologist
Aubrey Hill (1972–2020), American football coach
Austin Bradford Hill (1897–1991), British epidemiologist and statistician